Timeline of jazz education (a chronology of jazz pedagogy):  The initial jazz education movement in North American was much an outgrowth of the music education movement that had been in full swing since the 1920s. Chuck Suber (né Charles Harry Suber; 1921–2015), former editor of Down Beat, averred that the GI Bill following World War II was a key impetus for the jazz education movement in higher education.  During the WWII, the U.S. Armed Forces had been the nation's largest employer of musicians – including women musicians.  After the War, many of those musicians sought to pursue music as a career, and, with assistance of the GI Bill, found colleges offering curricular jazz.  Suber also pointed out that the rise of stage bands in schools was directly proportionate to the decline of big name bands.

Non-academic (non-curricular)

Social services for children

Scholastic, clinics, camps

Non-curricular collegiate

Academic (curricular)

Primary and secondary education in North America

Higher education outside of North America

Higher education in North America

Major music conservatories of North America 
 (not affiliated with a university)

National associations

Selected jazz studies in higher education, North America

Notes and references

Notes

Further reading

Books, magazines, journals, dissertations, and websites

Newspapers 

Jazz music education
Jazz education